Anyarude Bhoomi is a 1979 Indian Malayalam-language film directed by Nilambur Balan and produced by Unmachithra. The film stars Chowalloor Krishnankutty, Nilambur Balan, Amina and Kozhikode Sharada in the lead roles. The film has musical score by A. T. Ummer. The film marks the debut of Mamukkoya.

Cast

Chowalloor Krishnankutty
Nilambur Balan
Amina
Kozhikode Sharada
Kunjandi
Lalithasree
Mamukkoya
Master Anwar
Nilambur Ayisha
Zeenath
Vijayalakshmi

Soundtrack
The music was composed by A. T. Ummer and the lyrics were written by Bichu Thirumala.

References

External links
 

1979 films
1970s Malayalam-language films